Tulipa greigii, (Greig's tulip) is a species of tulip native to Central Asia and Iran.

Taxonomy
The Latin specific epithet greigi honors the Russian Samuel Greig, (1735-1788, "Father of the Russian navy") due to Greig once being president of the Russian Horticultural Society.

The tulip was originally found in Turkestan, and then published and described by Eduard August von Regel in Gartenflora Vol.22 on page 290 in 1873.

Description 
The blooms are more limited in colour shades than with other tulips, ranging from red and yellow to white.

It is known for its variegated green and purple-maroon leaves. Its cultivars 'Oratorio', 'Plaisir', 'Red Riding Hood', 'Toronto', and 'United States' have gained the Royal Horticultural Society's Award of Garden Merit.

It was featured on a Soviet postage stamp in 1960.

References

External links 
 http://www.bbc.co.uk/news/world-asia-pacific-13301419 Tulips from Kazakhstan

greigii
Flora of Central Asia
Flora of Iran
Plants described in 1873